The German language in East Germany (DDR), during its existence as a separate state from 1949 to 1990, developed differently from the German of West Germany because of significant differences in the country's political and socio-cultural environment. Additionally, from the late 1960s onwards the political leaders of the DDR were intent on affirming the independence of their state by "isolationist linguistic politics"<ref>{{Citation| last  = Müller| first = Gerhard| title = Der "Besserwessi" und die "innere Mauer". Anmerkungen zum Sprachgebrauch im vereinigten Deutschland | journal = In "Muttersprache. Vierteljahresschrift für deutsche Sprache"| year = 1994| pages = 119 ff| language = de}}</ref> with the objective of demarcating East Germany from West Germany by actively reducing the unity of the German language.

This political effort did not amount to the creation of a new language in the DDR but brought about a particular usage of the language and of linguistic behaviours specific to it, felt not in syntax or grammar, but in vocabulary, and manifesting itself in both the official and non-official spheres.

The result was that the German of the former East Germany includes two separate vocabularies, both different from the German of the Bundesrepublik: the  official Socialist one (Newspeak  or officialese) and the critically humorous one of everyday life.

Examples

Führerschein (driver's licence) - Fahrerlaubnis (Replacement of the word  Führer)
Handelsorganisation, HO - state retail business
Intershop - hard currency (later also Forum checks) retail store
Kader - personnel
Kommerzielle Koordinierung, KoKo -  secret commercial enterprise
Partei - Socialist Unity Party of Germany
Plattenbau - large panel system-building
Stasi - state security service
Westpaket - parcel from West Germany
Winkelement - small flag
der antifaschistische Schutzwall - Berlin Wall
Kollektiv - work team
Tal der Ahnungslosen (lit. "Valley of the Clueless") - two regions not able to receive TV programming from West Germany
Broiler - Western 'Brathähnchen'
Blaue Fliesen, blaue Kacheln - Deutsche Mark

Controversies
Jahresendflügelfigur - has been probably invented as a parody of state language.
Erdmöbel - allegedly coffin

References

Bibliography
In German
 Frank Thomas Grub:  „Wende“ und „Einheit“ im Spiegel der deutschsprachigen Literatur. Ein Handbuch. Band 1: Untersuchungen. De Gruyter, Berlin and New York 2003 
 Hugo Moser: Sprachliche Folgen der politischen Teilung Deutschlands. Beihefte zum „Wirkenden Wort“ 3. Schwann, Düsseldorf 1962
 Michael Kinne, Birgit Strube-Edelmann: Kleines Wörterbuch des DDR-Wortschatzes (2nd edn). Schwann, Düsseldorf 1981 
 Martin Ahrends (ed.): Trabbi, Telespargel und Tränenpavillon – Das Wörterbuch der DDR-Sprache. Heyne, München 1986 
 Wolf Oschlies: Würgende und wirkende Wörter – Deutschsprechen in der DDR. Holzapfel, Berlin 1989 
 Margot Heinemann: Kleines Wörterbuch der Jugendsprache. Bibliographisches Institut, Leipzig 1990 
 Manfred W. Hellmann: Divergenz und Konvergenz – Sprachlich-kommunikative Folgen der staatlichen Trennung und Vereinigung Deutschlands. In: Karin Eichhoff-Cyrus, Rudolf Hoberg (ed.): Die deutsche Sprache zur Jahrtausendwende – Sprachkultur oder Sprachverfall. Duden-Reihe Thema Deutsch, Band 1. Mannheim (Duden-Redaktion) and Wiesbaden (GfdS) 2000, pp. 247–275
 Marianne Schröder, Ulla Fix: Allgemeinwortschatz der DDR-Bürger – nach Sachgruppen geordnet und linguistisch kommentiert. Heidelberg 1997
 Birgit Wolf: Sprache in der DDR. Ein Wörterbuch. de Gruyter, Berlin und New York 2000 . online bei Google-Books
 Jan Eik: DDR-Deutsch: eine entschwundene Sprache. Jaron, Berlin 2010 
 Norbert Nail: Jenseits des „breiten Steins“: Studentendeutsch in der DDR. In: Studenten-Kurier 3/2013, pp. 15–17 
 Antje Baumann: Mit der Schwalbe zur Datsche. Wörter aus einem verschwundenen Land. Bibliographisches Institut – Duden, Berlin, 2020 

In English
 Russ, C. (2002). The German language today: A linguistic introduction. Routledge. (See Chapter 5 German in East Germany)
 Stevenson, P. (2002). Language and German disunity: a sociolinguistic history of East and West in Germany'', 1945-2000. Oxford University Press

German language
East Germany
Communist terminology